The Knights of Justice or Professed Knights, form the first of the three classes of members of the Sovereign Military Order of Malta together with the professed conventual chaplains. They make vows of poverty, chastity, and obedience. "They are religious in all respects and they comply with the universal and particular norms that concern them."

The religious superior of the Knights of Justice, under the Prince and Grand Master, is the Grand Commander, currently Fra' Emmanuel Rousseau.  Most Knights of Justice are members of a Priory or Subpriory.

All Knights of Justice have the title Fra'  (an abbreviation for the Latin word frater meaning brother).  They are divided into the following ranks:
 Venerable Bailiff Knights Grand Cross of Justice Professed in Perpetual Vows
 Knights Grand Cross of Justice Professed in Perpetual Vows
 Commanders of Justice Professed in Perpetual Vows
 Knights of Justice Professed in Perpetual Vows
 Knights of Justice Professed in Temporary Vows
 Knights admitted to the Novitiate

Until 1989 all Knights of Justice had to be nobles, but since then non-noble Knights of Magistral Grace have been permitted to advance into the category of Justice.  Until 2022 the Prince and Grand Master was elected from among the Knights of Justice who have the nobiliary requirements prescribed for the category of Knights of Honour and Devotion; this requirement no longer exists

Membership numbers

There are currently (2022) thirty-eight Knights of Justice.

Historical membership numbers of professed knights

Prominent living Knights of Justice

The abbreviation S.E. stands for Sua Eccellenza, His Excellency.  It is used by the members of the Sovereign Council, by grand priors, and by those knights who are bailiffs.

Robes

The black church robe worn by the Knights of Justice has a different shape from that worn by the knights of the second and third classes.  It is distinguished by the cross of Malta on the left side (not on the centre of the breast).  The cross is completely white (not merely outlined in white).

The Knights of Justice in perpetual vows wear an additional garment called a scapular (but different in shape from other monastic scapulars). It hangs from the back of the neck like a yoke and wraps around the back and then rests over the left forearm (similar to a maniple).  It has four large tassels and is embroidered in gold with the symbols of the Passion of Christ.

The red military uniform of the Knights of Justice is distinguished by a white collar, white lapels and white cuffs.  The feathers of the feluca worn by Knights of Justice are white instead of black.

Knights in minority
Until 1961 Knights of Justice could be admitted to the Order in minority, i.e. when they were children.  This would give them seniority when applying for commanderies in the Order. Most of these Knights of Justice in minority did not take solemn vows when they became adults.

Prince Philipp of Liechtenstein (born 19 August 1946) and Prince Nikolaus of Liechtenstein (born 24 October 1947) were admitted as Knights of Justice in minority at the ages of four and three on 15 November 1950; Neither brother took vows as an adult; Prince Nikolaus is now a Knight of Honour and Devotion. The last Knight of Justice in minority was Count Franz-Alfred von Hartig, who was admitted 31 May 1951 when he was sixteen; he never took vows and is now a Knight in Obedience and the Order's ambassador to Romania.

Other orders of knighthood

The term Knight of Justice is also used for a class of members in several other chivalric orders including the Sacred Military Constantinian Order of Saint George, the Johanniterorden (Rechtsritter), and the Most Venerable Order of the Hospital of Saint John of Jerusalem.  However, these knights are not professed religious who have taken the vows of poverty, chastity, and obedience.

Notes

Orders, decorations, and medals of the Sovereign Military Order of Malta